Biathlon at the 1986 Asian Winter Games took place in the city of Sapporo, Japan from 3 to 7 March 1986 in Makomanai Park with three events contested — all of them men's events. The host nation Japan dominated the event by winning all gold medals, China finished second, South Korea third.

Medalists

Medal table

References
 Results of the First Winter Asian Games

External links
 IBU official website

 
1986 Asian Winter Games events
1986
1986 in biathlon
Biathlon competitions in Japan